The Singitic Gulf, also known as the Mount Athos Gulf or the Holy Mountain Gulf is a gulf of the Thracian Sea, part of the northern Aegean Sea, in Chalkidiki, Greece. It is bounded by Sithonia in the west, and Mount Athos in the east. The island of Ammouliani sits in the northeastern portion of the gulf along Mount Athos. Many of the monasteries of Mount Athos lie along the shore of the Singitic Gulf.

References 

Thracian Sea
Gulfs of Greece
Landforms of Chalkidiki